James Marvin Leath (May 6, 1931 – December 8, 2000) was a U.S. Representative from Texas.

Born in Henderson, Texas, Leath attended the Rusk County public schools and graduated from Henderson High School in 1949. He attended Kilgore Junior College. B.B.A., University of Texas, Austin, 1954.
He served in the United States Army from 1954 to 1956 achieving the rank of first lieutenant.
Coached football and track, Henderson High School from 1957 to 1959.
Business salesman, 1959.
Banking, 1962.
Officer and director in five Texas banks, and two manufacturing companies.
He served as special assistant to United States Representative William R. Poage from 1972 to 1974.

Leath was elected as a Democrat to the Ninety-sixth and to the five succeeding Congresses (January 3, 1979 – January 3, 1991).
He was not a candidate for renomination in 1990 to the One Hundred Second Congress.
He died on December 8, 2000 in Arlington, Virginia.

Sources

External links

1931 births
2000 deaths
United States Army officers
Democratic Party members of the United States House of Representatives from Texas
20th-century American politicians
McCombs School of Business alumni